XHSIG-FM is a noncommercial radio station on 88.5 FM in Los Mochis, Sinaloa, Mexico. It is owned by Sinaloa, Arte y Gloria, A.C. and known as La Interesante de Los Mochis.

History
XHSIG was approved on December 19, 2017, as part of the IFT clearing a backlog of radio station applications in Los Mochis; it signed on air in September 2018, joining XHGVE-FM 94.5, which had been built two years earlier. The concessionaire was owned by Román Padilla Fierro—a former Institutional Revolutionary Party deputy for Sinaloa's first district, including the town of El Fuerte, and one-time secretary general of STIRT, the union representing broadcasting workers in Mexico—and Aldo Prandini.

References

Spanish-language radio stations
Radio stations in Sinaloa
2018 establishments in Mexico
Radio stations established in 2018